In mathematics, the nine lemma (or 3×3 lemma) is a statement about commutative diagrams and exact sequences valid in the category of groups and any abelian category. It states: if the diagram to the right is a commutative diagram and all columns as well as the two bottom rows are exact, then the top row is exact as well. Likewise, if all columns as well as the two top rows are exact, then the bottom row is exact as well.  Similarly, because the diagram is symmetric about its diagonal, rows and columns may be interchanged in the above as well.  

The nine lemma can be proved by direct diagram chasing, or by applying the snake lemma (to the two bottom rows in the first case, and to the two top rows in the second case).

Linderholm (p. 201) offers a satirical view of the nine lemma:
"Draw a noughts-and-crosses board... Do not fill it in with noughts and crosses... Instead, use curved arrows... Wave your hands about in complicated patterns over this board. Make some noughts, but not in the squares; put them at both ends of the horizontal and vertical lines. Make faces. You have now proved:
(a) the Nine Lemma
(b) the Sixteen Lemma
(c) the Twenty-five Lemma..."

There are two variants of nine lemma: sharp nine lemma and symmetric nine lemma (see Lemmas 3.3, 3.4 in Chapter XII of ).

References

Homological algebra
Lemmas in category theory